Benito Nardone Cetrulo (November 22, 1906 – March 25, 1964) was a Uruguayan journalist and political figure.

Biography
Nardone was born at Montevideo, the son of an Italian immigrant.

For many years he was a popular radio commentator at CX 4 Radio Rural. His political prominence came about after his long established reputation as a radio personality.

He was strongly identified with rural affairs. Prior to assuming the Presidency, he was seen as politically close to Domingo Bordaberry and his son Juan María Bordaberry, both of them heavily involved with a Ruralist affairs organization led by Nardone.

He was a prominent member of the Uruguayan National (Blanco) Party.

President of Uruguay

In 1960 Nardone's Blanco Party colleague Martín Echegoyen stepped down as President of the National Council of Government, so Nardone succeeded Echegoyen as president, remaining in charge until 1961.

Nardone was himself succeeded as President by Eduardo Víctor Haedo, also a Blanco Party colleague.

See also
 Politics of Uruguay

References

External link

1906 births
1964 deaths
People from Montevideo
Uruguayan people of Italian descent
National Party (Uruguay) politicians
Presidents of the National Council of Government (Uruguay)
Uruguayan radio journalists
Uruguayan radio presenters
Burials at the Central Cemetery of Montevideo
Liga Nacional de Accion Ruralista politicians